Giancarlo Prete (5 February 1943 – 9 March 2001) was an Italian actor.

After he worked in the cinema as stuntman, Prete went to Alessandro Fersen's acting school (where he later returned as a teacher) and began to act in many films and in television serials.

In the following years Prete worked as dubbing director and acted only in television productions (including the Space: 1999 episode “The Troubled Spirit” as Dr. Dan Mateo).

He was married to Elizabeth Jacinto and had a son named Alessandro, who is also an actor.

Filmography

1943 births
2001 deaths
Drama teachers
Italian male film actors
Italian male television actors
Male actors from Rome
Deaths from brain cancer in Italy